The Ambassador's Wife is a novel by American author Jennifer Steil about the kidnapping of an American woman in the Middle East. The story was inspired by the author's personal experiences as the wife of the British Ambassador to Yemen.

The book received the 2013 Best Novel award in the William Faulkner-William Wisdom Creative Writing Competition.

On August 18, 2015, the Mark Gordon Company announced that Anne Hathaway would star in a limited TV series adaptation of the novel.

External links 
 The Ambassador's Wife by Jennifer Steil on Goodreads.com

References 

2015 American novels
Novels set in Yemen
Doubleday (publisher) books